Eric Matthew Stefani (born June 17, 1967) is an American musician, composer, writer and animator best known as the founder and former member of the ska punk band No Doubt. He is the older brother of former bandmate Gwen Stefani and is also a former animator on the television series The Simpsons and The Ren & Stimpy Show.

Early life and education
Stefani is the son of Dennis and Patti Stefani. He attended Loara High School in Anaheim, California. He worked at a Dairy Queen with his sister Gwen and John Spence. He studied animation at the California Institute of the Arts in 1991.

According to No Doubt's guitarist Tom Dumont, Eric was able to write music for the band despite not knowing music theory—an accomplishment that impressed Dumont since he was a music major.

Career
Stefani, his sister Gwen and John Spence formed the band No Doubt in 1986. The group did add several members and performed live shows at venues such as Fenders Ballroom in Long Beach. The group started writing original material much of which Eric Stefani contributed. He left once the band's album Tragic Kingdom was recorded. Eric and Gwen were nominated as a songwriting team at the 1998 Grammy Awards for Song of the Year for "Don't Speak".

Stefani left the group before their breakthrough to work in animation full time, previously splitting his time with the band, and working for The Simpsons. The episode "Homerpalooza" contains a quick scene, drawn by Stefani, where the members of No Doubt appear, although they aren't featured.

In an interview on Late Night with Seth Meyers on October 26, 2020, Gwen revealed that Eric recorded some instrumentation on one of the tracks for her upcoming album, which ended up being "Let Me Reintroduce Myself".

References

External links 
Blogger: User Profile: Eric Stefani
 

1967 births
Living people
American rock keyboardists
American ska musicians
California Institute of the Arts alumni
Musicians from Anaheim, California
No Doubt members
20th-century American keyboardists